This is a list of emblems or coat of arms used in Indonesia. Indonesia is divided into 38 provinces, and each province is divided into regencies (kabupaten) and cities (kota). There are 416 regencies and 98 cities. Each province, regency, and city has its own emblem.

Many of the emblems incorporate rice and cotton (for prosperity and the fifth principle of Pancasila, a remnant from socialist heraldry popular during the guided democracy era); symbols marking Pancasila in entirety; as well as symbols marking the date Indonesia declared its independence, 17 August 1945.

National

Provincial

Regencies and cities

Aceh

North Sumatra

West Sumatra

Riau

Riau Islands

Jambi

South Sumatra

Bengkulu

Bangka Belitung Islands

Lampung

Banten

Jakarta

West Java

Central Java

Special Region of Yogyakarta

East Java

Bali

West Nusa Tenggara

East Nusa Tenggara

West Kalimantan

Central Kalimantan

South Kalimantan

East Kalimantan

North Kalimantan

West Sulawesi

South Sulawesi

Southeast Sulawesi

Central Sulawesi

Gorontalo

North Sulawesi

Maluku

North Maluku

Southwest Papua

West Papua

Central Papua

South Papua

Highland Papua

Papua

Historical

National

Kingdom and Sultanate

Subdivisions

States

Provinces

Colonial era

Cities and regencies

References 

National symbols of Indonesia